Orchestra Class (French: La Melodie) is a 2017 French film directed by Rachid Hami and starring Kad Merad. The film was screened at the Venice Film Festival and the Dubai International Film Festival.

Cast 
Kad Merad as Simon Daoud
Samir Guesmi as Farid
Renely Alfred as Arnold
Tatjana Rojo as Arnold's mother

Reception 
A critic from The Hollywood Reporter wrote that "But the film’s few, more lived-in moments often involve secondary characters with no story arc of their own, so they never feel properly integrated into the fabric of the otherwise very formatted plot". A critic from Screen International wrote that "The raucous energy that the youngsters offer gives Orchestra Class (La Melodie) a gritty sense of momentum". A critic from RFI wrote that "Alfred Renély is a touching and convincing young prodigy supported by a whole bunch of promising French film actors".

References 

2017 drama films
2010s French-language films